Eastland-Fairfield Career & Technical Schools (EFCTS), formerly Eastland Vocational Center (1968–2001), is a joint career & technical school district in Ohio. It serves 16 school districts in Franklin, Fairfield, and Pickaway counties. It covers an area of 700 square miles (1,813 km2), and is one of the largest career and technical districts geographically in Ohio.

Programs and courses 
Eastland-Fairfield has over 35 career and technical programs covering practically every career field.

Main campus courses 

* Nail Services is currently located at Fairfield Career Center but will be moving to Eastland Career Center for the 2023–24 school year, and beyond.

Satellite programs 

*Teaching Professions: Fairfield Career Center (Coming 2023–24)

Offsite programs

School Districts 
EFCTS serves 16 school districts in Franklin, Fairfield, and Pickaway counties.

 Amanda-Clearcreek High School
 Berne Union High School
 Bexley High School
 Bloom-Carroll High School
 Canal Winchester High School
 Fairfield Union High School
 Gahanna-Jefferson Public Schools
 Groveport Madison High School
 Hamilton Township High School
 Liberty Union High School
 New Albany-Plain Local School District
 Pickerington Local School District
 Reynoldsburg City Schools
 Teays Valley High School
 Millersport High School
 Whitehall-Yearling High School

Alumni recognition 
EFCTS recognizes alumni every five years.

References 

Education in Fairfield County, Ohio
Education in Franklin County, Ohio
School districts in Ohio
School districts established in 1968
Education in Pickaway County, Ohio
Technical schools